Thismia is a genus of myco-heterotrophic plants in family Burmanniaceae, first described as a genus in 1845. It is native to East and Southeast Asia, New Guinea, Australia, New Zealand, and the Americas.

 Species

 Thismia abei Hatus. – Awa, Shikoku Island, Japan
 Thismia alba Holttum – S Thailand, Pahang
 †Thismia americana N.Pfeiff. – extinct, formerly Lake Calumet, Illinois, USA
 Thismia angustimitra S.Chantanaorrapint – Thailand
 Thismia annamensis K.Larsen & Aver. – Vietnam
 Thismia arachnites Ridl. – W Malaysia
 Thismia aseroe Becc. – Perak, Singapore
 Thismia betung-kerihunensis Tsukaya & H.Okada – Kalimantan
 Thismia bifida M.Hotta – Sarawak
 Thismia brunneomitra Hroneš, Kobrlová & Dančák – Brunei
 Thismia brunonis Griff. – Myanmar
 †Thismia caudata Maas & H.Maas – extinct, formerly Brazil 
 Thismia chrysops Ridl – W Malaysia
 Thismia clandestina (Blume) Miq. – Java
 Thismia clavarioides K.R.Thiele – New South Wales
 Thismia coronata Dančák, Hroneš and Sochor  – Sarawak
 Thismia crocea (Becc.) J.J.Sm. – W New Guinea
 Thismia episcopalis (Becc.) J.J.Sm. – Borneo
 Thismia espirito-santensis Brade – Espírito Santo, Brazil
 Thismia filiformis Chantanaorr. – Thailand
 Thismia fumida Ridl – Selangor, Singapore
 †Thismia fungiformis (Taub. ex Warm.) Maas & H.Maas – extinct, formerly Brazil
 Thismia gardneriana Hook.f. ex Thwaites – Sri Lanka
 Thismia glaziovii Poulsen – Rio de Janeiro in Brazil
 Thismia goodii Kiew – Sabah
 Thismia grandiflora Ridl. – Johor in Malaysia
 Thismia hexagona Dančák, Hroneš, Kobrlová & Sochor, 2013 – Brunei
 Thismia hongkongensis S.S.Mar & R.M.K.Saunders – Hong Kong
 Thismia huangii P.Y.Jiang & T.H.Hsieh – Taiwan
 Thismia hyalina (Miers) Benth. & Hook.f. ex F.Muell. – Peru, Brazil
 Thismia iguassuensis (Miers) Warm. – Rio de Janeiro in Brazil
 Thismia inconspicua Sochor & Dančák, – Brunei
 Thismia janeirensis Warm – Rio de Janeiro and Minas Gerais, Brazil
 Thismia javanica J.J. Sm. – Thailand, Vietnam, Java, Sumatra
 Thismia jianfenglingensis – Hainan Island, China
 Thismia kobensis – Japan (never seen alive until 2021; holotype and only specimen found in 1992 and declared extinct in 2010 but not described until 2018, It was rediscovered in 2021, 20 specimens were found in a conifer plantation ) - Japan
 Thismia labiata J.J.Sm. – Sumatra
 Thismia lauriana Jarvie – Kalimantan
 Thismia luetzelburgii Goebel & Suess. – Costa Rica, Panama, Espirito Santo
 Thismia macahensis (Miers) F.Muell. – Rio de Janeiro, Brazil
 Thismia megalongensis C.Hunt, G.Steenbeeke & V.Merckx – New South Wales, Australia
 Thismia melanomitra & H.Maas – Ecuador
 Thismia mirabilis K. Larsen – Thailand
 Thismia mullerensis Tsukaya & H.Okada – Kalimantan
 Thismia neptunis Becc. – Sarawak
 Thismia nigricoronata Kumar & S.W.Gale – Laos
 Thismia ophiuris Becc. – Borneo
 Thismia ornata Dančák, Hroneš and Sochor  – Sarawak
 Thismia panamensis (Standl.) Jonker – from Costa Rica to Bolivia
 Thismia racemosa Ridl. – Pahang, Malaysia
 Thismia rodwayi F.Muell. – Fairy Lanterns – New South Wales, Tasmania, Victoria, New Zealand North Island
 Thismia saulensis – French Guiana
 Thismia singeri (de la Sota) Maas & H.Maas – Beni, Bolivia
 Thismia sitimeriamiae  Siti-Munirah, Dome & Thorogood, sp. nov. – Malaysia
 Thismia taiwanensis – Kaohsiung, Taiwan
 Thismia tentaculata K.Larsen & Aver. – Hong Kong, Vietnam
 Thismia thaithongiana Chantanaorr. & Suddee, 2018 – Thailand
 Thismia tuberculata Hatus. – Kyushu, Japan
 Thismia yorkensis Cribb – N Queensland

References

Burmanniaceae
Dioscoreales genera
Parasitic plants
Taxonomy articles created by Polbot